Real Littles, formerly and also called Shopkins, are a range of tiny, collectable toys manufactured by Moose Toys. Based on grocery store items, each plastic figure has a recognisable face and unique name. They also have special finishes like translucent, glitter, or squishy. The collectable toys (which are designated as common, rare, ultra-rare, special edition, limited edition, and exclusive) also had expanded into lines of clothing, trading cards, and other related merchandise.

The toy line began in 2014. As of 2021, there are fifteen seasons of the toys. There are also series that represent seasons such as Halloween, Easter, and Christmas. There are also spin-offs, with the current being the ongoing “Kindi Kids” line of dolls, released in August 2019.

History
Shopkins were designed and developed by Moose Toys in Melbourne in April 2013. Co-chief Paul Solomon credits his mother Jacqui Tobias, director of girls’ products, for the idea of Shopkins. Moose Toys had success with their line of Trash Pack collectible figurines targeted towards boys but lacked a market for girls. Shopkins was produced initially as a similar product for girls — however, it appeals to children in general.

Shopkins toys

Figures
Shopkins figurines are roughly 1 inch in height and 1/2 inch in width, roughly the size of a United States Quarter. Each figurine has a face, name, and its own personality. They are distributed in bright coloured packaging with bubble letters. Shopkins are based on grocery items such as a sweet apple named Apple Blossom, a chocolate bar named Cheeky Chocolate, a lipstick named Lippy Lips, and a chocolate chip cookie named Kooky Cookie.
There are hundreds of Shopkins in the Shopkins World. Shopkins are organized into categories such as Fruit & Veg or Bakery. They can be found in 2, 5, 8, 12, and 20 packs of Shopkins.

Rarities
Shopkins are collected and valued based on their rarity. Moose classifies the Shopkins degrees of rarity as “Common” (White (Purple in Seasons 12 onwards)), “Exclusive” (Turquoise), “Limited Edition” (Gold), “Rare” (Green), “Special Edition” (Blue), and “Ultra Rare” (Pink). The “Special Edition” Shopkins can only be found in 8 or 12 packs of Shopkins.

Materials
Materials used for Shopkins were rubbery-plastic, brought from China, and from Season 10 onwards, the plastic is from Vietnam.

Seasons
 Season 1 

The first season of Shopkins, was released in June 2014. The season came out in major retailers. The first season of Shopkins contained over 150 characters to collect, all based on grocery store items. Some of the teams include Fruit & Veg, Bakery, Sweet Treats, and more. The Limited Edition Shopkins come in a metallic finish.

 Season 2 

The second season of Shopkins was released in December 2014. The season featured new teams including Baby, Homewares, Cleaning & Laundry and Shoes. The Limited Edition Shopkins were covered in bling.

 Season 3 

Season Three was released in June 2015. The new teams, Stationery, International Food & Hats, were added to the season. The Third Season is the first season to have its Limited Edition Shopkins have their own specific theme, with the team name for the Limited Editions being the “Cool Jewels” Shopkins.

 Season 4 

Season Four was released in December 2015. This season introduced Petkins, which are Shopkins with faces that resemble animals. Other new categories include Party Time, Petshop, Garden, and Accessories. The Limited Edition Shopkins in the season are the “Perfume Pretties” Shopkins.

 Season 5 

Season Five was released in May 2016. New categories include Charms, Tech, Music and Sport. The Limited Edition Shopkins are the “Tiny Toys” Shopkins.

 Season 6 

Season Six, also known as Chef Club, was released in October 2016. Instead of having specific teams, Shopkins were food ingredients for various recipes, meaning they belonged to multiple ones at once depending on their type. The Limited Edition Shopkins are the “CUTEtensils” Shopkins, and are based on utensils instead of food. The sixth season is the first season to have Shoppies in the season, with for this season, under the Chef Club line.

 Season 7 

Season Seven, also known as Join the Party, was released on February 5, 2017. The special edition Shopkins for this season are the Topkins, which can be stacked on top of each other. Also, instead of coming in recipe books, they come in presents. The Limited Editions in the season are the “Hollywood” Shopkins.

 Season 8 

Season 8, also known as “World Vacation” was released in June 2017. The season was divided in three waves for its 3 respective continents featuring Shopkins from around the world. The first wave is from Europe released in June 2017, which features the countries France, United Kingdom, Italy, Germany, and Spain. The second wave is from Asia and features the countries China, Japan, Australia (despite not being an Asian country,) and India. The third wave features the Americas which features both of the continents North America and South America respectively, and features the countries Canada, the United States, Mexico, and Brazil, however, unlike the first two waves which had one country have Ultra Rares, a different theme was given for the Ultra Rares which were the “Gleamtastic Holidays” Shopkins, based on several holidays found in the countries, such as Valentines Day and Independence Day for example. This time in this season, the Shopkins now come in hotel rooms. The Special Edition Shopkins in this season are the “Bag Charms” while the Limited Editions are the “Shimmering Snow Globes” Shopkins.

 Season 9 

Season 9, also known as “Wild Style” was released in January 2018. The theme for the season is animals, which include dogs, cats, bunnies, tigers, cows, monkeys, skunks, pandas. and unicorns. The teams in the season are considered “tribes”, which in each one contain new Shopkins with their own team's finishes, which also include returning Shopkins, like Apple Blossom and Cupcake Queen. They can be found in pet-pods. The season also introduces “Shoppets”, which are fuzzy, anthropomorphic animals. During Season Ten (the next season), a wave 2 of Shoppets were made. Shoppies in the season are also returning characters but now with animal themes. A new Shoppie for this season, Mystabella, was released as a Limited Edition Shoppie. There were also bundled sets of Shoppies and Shoppets available. The limited editions in the season are the “Shimmery Unicorn” Shopkins, which come in a metallic finish and a unicorn theme.

 Season 10 

Season 10, also known as “Mini Packs” was released in June 2018. In this season, all of the Shopkins from Seasons 1, 2, and 3 are rereleased, but now with the same colours as their own static art and colored irises, and come in mini packs. Some also come with new finishes including the “hot spot” finish, which features Shopkins with spots on them. The limited editions are all metallic.

 Season 11 

Season 11, also known as “Family Mini Packs” was released in January 2019. Similar to the previous season, the season also comes with mini packs of their own, but now features Shopkins as “families”. Each team is considered a “family”, which contains new Shopkins (which contain a Father, Mother, a Sibling or Relative) and a new kind of Shopkin, called a “Babykin”, was released as smaller Shopkins to look like “babies” in the family. The limited editions are the “Bubs N Spices” family Shopkins.

 Season 12 

Season 12, also known as “Real Littles” was released in August 2019. The mini packs are themed after real brands, mainly from food such as some of the Kellogg's brands, Welch's, and more, with the exception of the Special Editions (which are the Skechers shoes Shopkins.)

 Season 13 

Season 13 was released in January 2020. The “Real Littles” theme keeps on going, but now comes in a theme of various food from the freezer aisle. There are Shopkins based on the Unilever family of brands, new Special Edition Slush Puppy Shopkins, and more.

 Season 14 

Season 14 was released in August 2020. The “Real Littles” theme also keeps on going for this season, but the “Shopkins” name would be dropped entirely (although it's still being considered as “Shopkins” themselves). In this season, some of the Shopkins from Seasons 12 and 13 are rereleased (similar to Season 10 when they rereleased the Shopkins from the first 3 seasons itself,) and this season is given a vending machine theme.

 Season 15 

Initially appearing as if Shopkins were discontinued, a ToyWiz listing showing new characters (along with some returning Shopkins from Season 14 as well as some from the first two seasons of Real Littles that weren't in Season 14) was discovered on July 19, 2021, set to release in October that year. This season has a “Micro Mart” theme, and will feature new variants of foods from the same brands, but also featuring new Special Edition ICEE slushie Shopkins.

 Season 16 

Season Sixteen is the sixteenth season of the Shopkins franchise. This is the fifth season to use the Real Littles theme and the first since Season Thirteen to include the Shopkins name. The season also has a Snack Time theme. The season released in late-June, 2022 through Amazon before reaching store shelves in mid-July. The Limited Editions are the Gemtastic Shopkins.

Spin-offs

Shopkins Shoppies
Shopkins Shoppies, the first spin-off of Shopkins being released in October 2015, is a line of 5-inch dolls, featuring teenage girls with brushable, colourful hair, accessories, exclusive Shopkins entitled “Shopkins B.F.F.S.” and are themed after stuff such as food, flowers, and fashion. The dolls also come with VIP codes (which are cards or mini magazines, or secret diaries (Lil’ Secrets only) depending on the line), which can be used for the Shopkins World app. The original line consisted of three dolls, “Jessicake” “Bubbleisha” and “Popette” respectively, later add 2 new Shoppies, “Peppa-Mint” and “Donatina” in December 2015. Separate lines of the dolls were also produced, including Core Shoppies and Style Shoppies. Some were also found in various seasons. Special Edition dolls were also made, with the first being “Gemma Stone”, named after the audition Shopkin of the same name, was released as a Walmart exclusive in November 2016 for a Black Friday sale. Beginning in 2018, with 2nd Special Edition Shoppie “Chandelia”, Special Edition Shoppies were released every year, starting in October, and as Target exclusives. Starting in 2016, Limited Edition Shoppies were also available during events in San Diego Comic-Con, until 2018.

Shoppies
Bubbleisha (Oct. 2015)
Jessicake (Oct. 2015)
Popette (Oct. 2015)
Donatina (Dec. 2015) *Toys R Us Exclusive*
Peppa-Mint (Dec. 2015)
Rainbow Kate (June 2016)
Sara Sushi (June 2016)
Pam Cake (June 2016)
Pineapple Lily (Aug. 2016) *Target Exclusive*
Popette (Aug. 2016)
Kirstea (Dec. 2016)
Pirouetta (Dec. 2016)
Lippy Lulu (Jan. 2017)

Core Shoppies
Cocolette (Feb. 2017)
Daisy Petals (Feb. 2017)
Lucy Smoothie (Feb. 2017)
Polli Polish (Feb. 2017)
Marsha Mello (June 2017)
Pippa Melon (June 2017)
Blossom Apples (Aug. 2017)
Melodine (Aug. 2017)
Coco Cookie (Jan. 2018)
Fria Froyo (Jan. 2018)
Lemony Limes (Jan. 2018)
Makaella Wish (Jan. 2018)

Style Shoppies
Lolita Pops (May 2018)
Pommie (May 2018)
Summer Peaches (May 2018)
Jascenta (June 2018)
B'Anchor (Aug. 2018)
Palmela Tree (Aug. 2018)
Sandi Shores (Aug. 2018)
Berri D'lish (Dec. 2018)
Kokonut (Dec. 2018)
Isla Hibiscus (Dec. 2018)
Popsi Blue (Dec. 2018)
Crystal Snow (May 2019) *UK Exclusive*
Sunny Meadows (May 2019) *UK Exclusive*
Riana Radio (May 2019) *UK Exclusive*
Ellerina Slippers (May 2019) *UK Exclusive*

Chef Club
Bubbleisha (Oct. 2016)
Donatina (Oct. 2016)
Jessicake (Oct. 2016)
Peppa-Mint (Oct. 2016)

Join The Party
Bridie (Feb. 2017)
Rainbow Kate (Feb. 2017)
Rosie Bloom (Feb. 2017)
Tiara Sparkles (Feb. 2017)
Tippy Teapot (Feb. 2017)
Pineapple Lily (Apr. 2017)
Pretti Pressie (Apr. 2017)

World Vacation
Jessicake (June 2017)
Macy Macaron (June 2017)
Spaghetti Sue (June 2017)
Zoe Zoom (June 2017) *Toys R Us Exclusive*
Peppa-Mint (July 2017)
Bubbleisha (Aug. 2017)
Sara Sushi (Aug. 2017)
Coralee (Aug. 2017)
Donatina (Oct. 2017)
Pinkie Cola (Oct. 2017)
Rainbow Kate (Oct. 2017)
Rosa Piñata (Oct. 2017)
Skyanna (Nov. 2017) *Walmart Exclusive*

Wild Style
Bella Bow (Jan. 2018)
Jessicake (Jan. 2018)
Lippy Lulu (Jan. 2018)
Mia Milk (Jan. 2018) *Toys R Us Exclusive*
Mystabella (Jan. 2018)
Pirouetta (Jan. 2018)
Rainbow Kate (Jan. 2018)
Candy Sweets (Mar. 2018)
Donatina (Mar. 2018)
Peppa-Mint (Mar. 2018)
Pippa Melon (Mar. 2018)
Valentina Hearts (Mar. 2018)

Lil' Secrets
Donatina (Aug. 2018)
Jessicake (Aug. 2018)
Marsha Mello (Aug. 2018)
Peppa-Mint (Aug. 2018)
Rainbow Kate (Aug. 2018)
Sia Shell (Sept. 2018)
Tia Tigerlily (Sept. 2018)
Bella Bow (Jan. 2019)
Jenni Lantern (Jan. 2019)
Lippy Lulu (Jan. 2019)
Pearlina (Jan. 2019)
Cocolette (May 2019)
Popette (May 2019)

Real Littles
Chrissy Puffs (Aug. 2019)
Stacey Cakes (Jan. 2020)

SDCC Exclusive
Jessicake (July 2016)
Bubbleisha (July 2017)
Chip Choc (July 2018)
Peppa-Mint (July 2018)

Store Exclusive
Bubbleisha (Sept. 2016) *Kohl's Exclusive*
Gemma Stone (Nov. 2016) *Walmart Exclusive*
Pretti Pressie (Sept. 2017) *Kohl's Exclusive*
Lucy Smoothie (Sept. 2017) *Costco Exclusive*
Polli Polish (Sept. 2017) *Costco Exclusive*
Pirouetta (Nov. 2017) *Amazon Exclusive*
Cocolette (June 2018) *International Exclusive*
Bridie (Sept. 2018) *Costco Exclusive*
Macy Macaron (Sept. 2018) *Costco Exclusive*
Chandelia (Sept. 2018) *Target Exclusive*
Bubbleisha (Nov. 2018) *Walmart Exclusive*
Pippa Melon (Jan. 2019) *Target Exclusive*
Angelique Star (Oct. 2019) *Target Exclusive*
Wynter Frost (Oct. 2020) *Target Exclusive*

Cutie Cars
The third spin-off, “Cutie Cars” was released in August 2017. The line featured cars with Shopkins faces on them, also themed after stuff like food, fashion and accessories. along with mini Shopkins to ride on. There were also Limited Editions produced prior to Season 3, as well as an exclusive set from San Diego Comic Con which were 2 Golden Cutie Cars in 2018. Starting in Season 3 onwards, Moose developed “Color Changing Cutie Cars” and "Color Change Fantasy Cutie Cars" in season 4. The slogan is “I Heart QT CARS”. With only 4 seasons produced, the line was also discontinued in 2020.

Season One

Season One Cutie Cars include:

Single Packs
Cupcake Cruiser
Choc Chip Racer
Strawberry Speedy Seeds
Popcorn Moviegoer
Donut Express
Sundae Scooter
Lemon Limo
Peely Apple Wheels
Traveling Taco
Banana Bumper
Motor Melon
Frozen Yocart
Ice Cream Dream Car
Jelly Bean Machine
Lollipop Soft Top
Hotdog Hotrod
Zoomy Noodles
Jelly Joyride
Milk Moover
Bumpy Burger
Wheely Wishes

Fast 'n' Fruits Collection
Orange Rush
Kiwi Cutie
Zappy Pineapple

Candy Combo Collection
Candi Combi
Mint Sprinter
Candy Heart Car

Freezy Riders Collection
Soft Swerve
Strawberry Scoupé
Zippy Popsicle

Bumper Bakery Collection
Happy B. SUV
Choc-Cherry Wheels
Rainbow Rider

Super Stylish Limited Edition Cars
Flashy Fashionsta
Sneaky Speedster
Royal Roadster

Drive Thru Diner
Wizzy Soda

Season 2

Season Two Cutie Cars were released in January 2018. They include:

Single Packs
Toasty Coaster
Pickup Pumpkin
Speedy Summer Fruits
Moto Gelato
Beauty Van
Ballet Coupe
Tropic Rush
Kissy Cab
Hatrod
Wheely Sneaky
Drifter Gift
Go-Go Donut
Yo Go-Cart
Bubby Beeps
Berry Fast Croissant
Applemobile
Icy Roller
Peanut Butter Pickup
Rain-Go Cake
Apple Pie Ride
Heart Braker
Chase Cookie

Precious Ride Limited Edition Cars
Treasure Drove
Limo-Queen
Rollin' Gemstones

Pretty Performers Collection
Scooty Tutu
Zippy Lippy
Melody Moover

Speedy Style Collection
Street Sneaker
Cruisey Cap
Sunny Sedan

Dessert Drivers Collection
Fruity Zoomer
Cherry-Pie Chaser
Banana Split Trip

Breakfast Beeps Collection
Pop-Up Truck
Cruisy Croissant
Bagel Beeper

Happy Places
Another spin-off of Shopkins, “Happy Places” was released in August 2016. The line features many playsets such as houses and other buildings, and can de decorated with petkins furniture. The furniture sets in the line featured shopkin faces on them, and are themed after various animals. Smaller Shoppies were also made, entitled “Lil Shoppies”. A Disney version for the series was also produced. The series also has store-exclusive playsets, including the “Sparkle Hill” playsets (Walmart exclusive) and the “Movie Night Besties” pack with exclusive Jessicake and Popette Lil’ Shoppies (Big W exclusive). The slogan was “Decorate your Place with a Cute Lil’ Face!” later changed to “Turn Any Space into a Cute Place!” With only 8 seasons produced, the line was discontinued in 2020.

Season 1 Wave 1
Popette (Happy Home)
Bubbleisha (Bathing Bunny Welcome Pack)
Coco Cookie (Kitty Kitchen Welcome Pack)
Jessicake (Dreamy Bear Welcome Pack)
Kirstea (Puppy Parlor Lil' Shoppie)
Lippy Lulu (Bathing Bunny Lil' Shoppie)
Melodine (Dreamy Bear Lil' Shoppie)
Rainbow Kate (Kitty Kitchen Lil' Shoppie)
Sara Sushi (Puppy Parlor Lil' Shoppie)
Spaghetti Sue (Kitty Kitchen Lil' Shoppie)

Season 1 Wave 2
Lucy Smoothie (Sparkle Hill Happy Home)
Kristina Apples (Kitty Dinner Party Lil' Shoppie)
Riana Radio (Slumber Bear Party Lil' Shoppie)
Tiara Sparkles (Kitty Dinner Party Lil' Shoppie)

Season 2 Wave 1
Peppa-Mint (Pool and Sun Deck)
Milly Mops (Bunny Laundry Welcome Pack)
Queenie Hearts (Mousy Hangout Welcome Pack)
Rosie Bloom (Puppy Patio Welcome Pack)
Candy Sweets (Slumber Bear Party Lil' Shoppie)
Chelsea Cheeseburger (Puppy Parlor Lil' Shoppie)
Cocolette (Dreamy Bear Lil' Shoppie)
Daisy Petals (Puppy Patio Lil' Shoppie)
Polli Polish (Bathing Bunny Lil' Shoppie)
Tippy Teapot (Kitty Kitchen Lil' Shoppie)

Season 2 Wave 2
Fria Froyo (Puppy Patio Lil' Shoppie)
Macy Macaron (Kitty Kitchen Lil' Shoppie)
Pia Puzzle (Mousy Hangout Lil' Shoppie)

Lil' Secrets
The fourth spin-off, “Lil’ Secrets” was released in August 2018. The line is similar to Polly Pocket, in which it features lockets, which were playsets, that came with “Tenny Shoppies” and “Tenny Shopkins”. Regular-sized Shoppies were also produced. Starting in Season 3, mini stores and houses were released, under the name “Secret Shops”. The theme for Season 2 is “Party Pop-ups” and for Season 3, “Shop-key-pers”. With only 4 seasons produced, the line was also discontinued in 2020.

Secret Locks
So Sweet Candy with Lolita Pops (August 2018)
Donut Stop with Donatina (August 2018)
Pretty Paws with Bell (August 2018)
Pretty Petals with Daisy Petals (August 2018)
Great Bakes Cupcakes with Jessicake (August 2018)
Make Up Salon with Lippy Lulu (August 2018)
Cutie Fruity Smoothies with Pineapple Lily (August 2018)
Cute Scoops Ice Cream with Peppa-Mint (August 2018)
Dainty Dance Studio with Pirouetta (August 2018)
Bubbling Beauty Day Spa with Bub-Lea (January 2019)
Princess Hair Salon with Bubbleisha (January 2019)
Peacock Gala with Chandelia (January 2019)
Lovely Hearts Garden Party with Bridie (January 2019)
Genie's D'lish Wish Café with Gemma Stone (January 2019)
Fab Fairy Fashions with Pommie (January 2019)

Secret Lockets
Pizza Paradise with Spaghetti Sue (August 2018)
Locally Grown Farmers Market with Summer Peaches (August 2018)
Lil' Giggles Baby Boutique with Mia Milk (August 2018)
Petite Boutique with Bella Bow (August 2018)
Lil' Gems Jewelry with Tiara Sparkles (August 2018)
Tiny Tunes Music with Melodine (August 2018)
Swirls Froyo Bar with Fria Froyo (August 2018)
Picnic Dreams with Valentina Hearts (August 2018)
Rock Pool Swim School with Coralee (August 2018)
Fairy Cake Birthday with Makella Wish (January 2019)
Butterfly Nail Boutique with Polli Polish (January 2019)
Wonderland Picnic with Queenie Hearts (January 2019)
Masquerade Theatre with Hollie Wood (January 2019)
Mermaid's Adventure with Starla (January 2019)
Rodeo Smoothie Bar with Lucie Smoothie (January 2019)

Shoppies
Donatina (August 2018)
Jessicake (August 2018)
Marsha Mello (August 2018)
Peppa-Mint (August 2018)
Rainbow Kate with Bedroom Hideaway playset (August 2018)
Sia Shell (August 2018)
Tia Tigerlily (August 2018)
Bella Bow (January 2019)
Jenni Lantern (January 2019)
Lippy Lulu (January 2019)
Pearlina (January 2019)
Cocolette (January 2019)
Popette (January 2019)

Secret Shops
Rosie Bloom Café with Rosie Bloom (June 2019)
Cool Scoops Café with Popsi Blue (June 2019)
Sweet Retreat Candy Shop with Candy Sweets (June 2019)
Happy Steps Dance Studio with Ellerina Slippers (June 2019)
Game On Arcade with Pretti Pressie (June 2019)
Sprinkles Surprise Bakery with Sprinkles (June 2019)
Lovely Llama Style Salon with Pommie (January 2020)
Funny Bunny Bakery with Fria Froyo (January 2020)
Cutie Cat Cafe with Coco Cookie (January 2020)
Penguin Slushie Shop with Pinky Cola (January 2020)

Secret Bag Tags
Precious Perfumery with Jascenta (June 2019)
Delish Donut Stop with Donatina (June 2019)
Burger Bite Diner with Chelsea Cheeseburger (June 2019)
Blossom Sushi Eatery with Sara Sushi (June 2019)
Tiny Paws Vet with Princess Moondream (June 2019)
Le Sweet Petite Café with Macy Macaron (June 2019)

Playsets
Secret Small Mall with Glossie and Rainbow Kate (June 2019)

Kindi Kids
Kindi Kids is the fifth and ongoing spin-off of Shopkins released in August 2019, featuring the Shoppies dolls as toddlers, with the slogan being “Yay! Let’s Play!”. The line featured ten-inch dolls of the Shoppies dolls as toddlers, featuring a bobble-head, glittery eyes as well two exclusive Shopkins that magically function by playing with them. Various Playsets were also released under the “Kindi Fun” name tag. Unlike the rest of the franchise, the Kindi Kids line of dolls are meant for preschoolers.

The list of dolls released include:

Snack Time Friends
Jessicake (August 2019)
Donatina (August 2019)
Peppa-Mint (August 2019)
Marsha Mello (August 2019)
Rainbow Kate (December 2019)
Summer Peaches (February 2020)

Fun Time Friends
Cindy Pops (August 2020)
Mystabella (August 2020)
Bella Bow (February 2021)
Pirouetta (February 2021)

Dress Up Friends
Donatina (August 2020)
Marsha Mello (August 2020)

Kindi Fun Oven
Donatina (August 2020)
Summer Peaches (August 2020)
Bella Bow (August 2021)

Scented Big Sisters
Berri D'LISH (August 2021)
Pearlina (August 2021)
Tiara Sparkles (August 2021)
Candy Sweets (February 2022)
Flora Flutters (February 2022)
Angelina Wings (August 2022)
Tropicarla (August 2022)

Sweet Treats Friends
Bubbleisha (August 2021)
Cici Candy (August 2021)

Scented Baby Sisters
Mini Mello (August 2021)
Blossom Berri (August 2021)
Teenie Tiara (August 2021)
Poppi Pearl (August 2021)
Bonni Bubbles (August 2021)
Cutie Cake (August 2021)
Mirabella (August 2021)
Pastel Sweets (February 2022)
Fifi Flutters (February 2022)
Patticake (August 2022)
Winnie Wings (August 2022)
Tulla Tropics (August 2022)
Mimi Mint (February 2023)

Dress Up Magic
Jessicake & Patticake Fairy (August 2022)
Marsha Mello & Mini Mello Unicorn (August 2022)
Angelina Wings & Winnie Wings Angel (August 2022)
Tropicarla & Tulla Tropics Mermaid (August 2022)
Secret Saddle Rainbow Star & Mystabella (August 2022)
Peppa-Mint & Mimi Mint Pixie (February 2023)

Show & Tell Pets
Pupkin the Puppy (February 2021)
Marlo the Bunny (February 2021)
Teah the Koala (February 2021)
Caterina the Kitty (February 2021)

Party Pets
Cuppipuppi (August 2022)
Kitty Mello (August 2022)
Troppi Koala (August 2022)
Popsie Mint (February 2023)

Playsets Dolls
Back-To-School Fun with Jessicake (Summer 2020)
Shiver n’ Shake Rainbow Kate (August 2020)
Doctors Dress Up with Marsha Mello (August 2020; Target exclusive)
Kindi Fun Oven (Donatina & Summer Peaches variants released August 2020, Bella Bow variant released August 2021)
Kindi Fun Delivery Scooter (2020; BJ's Wholesale Club exclusive, comes with original Marsha Mello and recolored Delivery Scooter)
Doctor Bag with Rainbow Kate (August 2022)
Tea Party with Kirstea (August 2022)

Kindi Kids Minis
Kindi Kids made a spin-off, called Kindi Kids Minis featuring miniature versions of the ten-inch dolls, but still with the bobble-head feature and glittery eyes. Various playsets were made featuring vehicles like scooters, motorcycles, and cars, and a school bus playset, each with exclusive minis. The line was released early in January 2021 (Amazon) and February 2021 (retailers) respectively.

Season 1
Marsha Mello (February 2021)
Rainbow Kate (February 2021)
Summer Peaches (February 2021)
Lippy Lulu (February 2021)
Cindy Pops (February 2021)
Pirouetta (February 2021)

Season 2
Jessicake (August 2021)
Donatina (August 2021)
Mystabella (August 2021)
Berri D'LISH (August 2021)
Pearlina (August 2021)
Tiara Sparkles (August 2021)

Season 3
Candy Sweets (February 2022)
Flora Flutters (February 2022)

Kindi Mini Vehicles
Donatina's Car (February 2021) 
Rainbow Kate's Airplane (February 2021) 
Lippy Lulu's Scooter (February 2021) 
Peppa-Mint's Scooter (February 2022)

Playsets
Bobble School Bus with Marsha Mello (February 2021) 
Rainbow Unicorn Carnival with Rainbow Kate (August 2021)

Media

Web series
In August 2014, Moose Toys built brand awareness with their Shopkins short cartoon videos on their YouTube channel “Shopkins World” (Now known as “MooseTube Squad” to promote other toys by Moose), but it was the YouTube videos of consumers unwrapping and playing with the toys that helped bring the line to mainstream prominence. Canadian-based WildBrain distributes the webisodes on the WildBrain - Cutie Cartoons channel.

Movies
An animated film called “Shopkins: Chef Club” was released on DVD October 25, 2016 by Universal Pictures Home Entertainment to promote the sixth season of Shopkins toys. The movie had mostly positive reviews, although some reviewers had concerns at the overt consumerism.

A sequel, “Shopkins: World Vacation” was released on October 11, 2017, to promote the toys for Season 8, and also the first to feature a guest star, YouTuber CookieSwirlC. Another sequel, “Shopkins: Wild”, was released on March 1, 2018, on theaters in Australia and April 17, 2018, on DVD to promote the toys for Season 9.

Licensed merchandise

McDonald's Happy Meal Toys
In December 2015, Moose Toys partnered up with McDonald's to release Happy Meal-exclusive Shopkins, mainly based on items found from the fashion department. The same toys were released in France in 2017, and later Mexico in 2018.

In January 2018, McDonald's released “Happy Places” themed furniture Shopkins toys based on one of their spin-off lines of the toys. The toys were later released in Southeast Asia.

Another spin-off line, Cutie Cars happy meal toys were released in 2019. It was terminated in 2020 due to the COVID-19 pandemic as McDonald's shifted to nonstop Disney toys.

Shopkins Direct
From May 2017 to March 2018, Moose Toys partnered up with subscription box licensee, CultureFly, to promote "Shopkins Direct" which was a subscription box with Shopkins accessories and merchandise.

See also
 Moose Toys, the company that makes Shopkins.
The Trash Pack/The Grossery Gang, a similar toy line in which the Shopkins line of toys were based on.
 Enchantimals, a doll line inspired by the Shoppies dolls.
 Cassandra Lee Morris, provides voice notably for Jessicake.
 Erika Harlacher, provides voice for many characters in the Shopkins franchise, most notably Bubbleisha.

References

Doll brands
2010s toys
Rubber toys
Toy collecting
Toy figurines
Films set in Paris
Films set in France
Animated films set in New York City